Záboří refers to the following places in the Czech Republic:

Záboří (České Budějovice District), a village in České Budějovice District
Záboří (Strakonice District), a village in Strakonice District
Záboří nad Labem, a village in Kutná Hora District